A Shocking Night is a 1921 American silent comedy film directed by and starring Eddie Lyons and Lee Moran. The cast also included Alta Allen and Lionel Belmore.

Cast
 Eddie Lyons as Richard Thayer
 Lee Moran as William Harcourt
 Alta Allen as Bessie Lane
 Lillian Hall as Maude Harcourt
 Lionel Belmore as Bill Bradford
 Clark Comstock as Jack Lane
 Florence Mayon as Cook
 Charles McHugh as Butler

References

Bibliography
 Connelly, Robert B. The Silents: Silent Feature Films, 1910-36, Volume 40, Issue 2. December Press, 1998.
 Munden, Kenneth White. The American Film Institute Catalog of Motion Pictures Produced in the United States, Part 1. University of California Press, 1997.

External links
 

1921 films
1921 comedy films
1920s English-language films
American silent feature films
Silent American comedy films
American black-and-white films
Universal Pictures films
1920s American films